Harold Seymore Scott ARIBA (5 October 1883–25 December 1945) was a noted architect best known for designing cinemas during the 1920s and 1930s.

Scott was born in Birmingham in 1883, and he was to live and work here for the rest of his life. However, he designed cinema buildings across the United Kingdom. He married Doris Bailey (1890-1939) in 1910, and with her had two sons: John Seymore Scott (1914-2012), and Harold Raymond Scott (1915-1991), both of whom, like their father, were architects. From 1911 to 1925 he was in partnership with Harold William Weedon, the two working together to design several high-quality cinemas in Warwickshire including the Birchfield Picturedrome in Birchfield, completed in 1913, and several upmarket houses in Warwickshire. Scott was an Associate member of the Royal Institute of British Architects.

On his death in 1945 he left an estate valued at £156214 7s. 7. to his two sons, his wife having predeceased him.

Cinemas designed by Scott
The Empire (1934), Aldershot, Hampshire
The Piccadilly (1930), Stratford Road, Birmingham
The Electric Picture House (1912), Birmingham
Regal Cinema (1932), Camberley, Surrey
The Oak Cinema (1923), Selly Oak
Regal Cinema, Handsworth, Birmingham
Pavilion Cinema, Stirchley, Birmingham
Regal Cinema (1937), Cirencester, Gloucestershire
Regal Cinema (1932), Lichfield
Regal Cinema (1933), Farnham, Surrey

Cinemas designed by Scott & Weedon
Birchfield Picturedrome (1913), Birchfield, Birmingham

Other works by Scott
The Wyche Free Church (1911), Malvern, Worcestershire
Redmarley (1936), 32 Pritchatts Road, Birmingham

References

1883 births
1945 deaths
People from Birmingham, West Midlands
Architects from Birmingham, West Midlands
20th-century English architects
Associates of the Royal Institute of British Architects
Art Deco architects